Skiboy is a British action TV-Series produced and created by Derrick Sherwin and Charles de Jaeger. The series ran for 13 episodes from 13 May 1974 to 5 August 1974 on ITV before being cancelled. The entire series was filmed at the mountainous location of Saint-Luc in Switzerland, where the plots for the episodes mostly center around dramatic events in the mountains.

Origins 
During the 1960s and 70s, ITC Entertainment was responsible for producing ITV's numerous television Series with plots concerning fantasy, science-fiction, and especially action. In the beginning of 1973, Derrick Sherwin, with the help of Dennis Spooner, developed an idea based on action and ski, as skiing was starting to become an extremely popular sport at this time. As for finding a location to film, Charles de Jaeger proposed to Sherwin that the ideal place would be in one of the most traditional villages of the Val d'Anniviers, in Saint-Luc. After having filmed the series successfully in the mountainous region in the winter of 1973–74, the double-length pilot episode, Mountain Witch was released on 13 May 1974.

Characters

Bobbie Noel 
Played by Stephen R. Hudis. Bobbie is the youngest son of the Noel family that resides in the mountains. His parents are owner of a hotel in his alpine hometown, and his brother, Jean, is part of the mountain rescue team. He is mostly followed by his girlfriend, Sadie (played by Margot Alexis), that also enjoys skiing, and his faithful dog, Gruff. In the series, he is regarded as being the main character, which he is called Skiboy, and comes to the rescue in dangerous situations with his amazing skiing skills. His dream is to become an olympic skier, thereby, using Saint-Luc as practice, with the help of Jean. Bobbie is mostly seen wearing his yellow and black winter clothes.

Gruff 
Gruff is a Lakeland Terrier that accompanies Bobbie everywhere he goes in the village.

Sadie McStay 
Played by Margot Alexis. Sadie is Bobbie's girlfriend that resides with his family and friends at Saint-Luc. In the episodes, she is mostly seen skiing with him on the slopes.

Jean Noel 
Played by Robert Coleby. Jean is Bobbie's older brother and is part of the mountain rescue team of Saint-Luc and is sometimes on duty at the hotel restaurant. When Bobbie is faced into hard situations, Jean is normally there to help Bobbie by bringing him tools, or even helping the pursuit of some bandits on the slopes.

Jacques Noel 
Played by Frederick Jaeger. Jacques is Bobbie's uncle, and owner of the hotel. He is not seen on many episodes, but when seen, is helping Bobbie. In the episode Buried Menace, he relays by radio, instructions on how to de-fuse a recently discovered bomb to Bobbie from an arms expert.

Jane Noel 
Played by Patricia Haines (although played by Pauline Challoner in the episode Cold Shoulder). Jane is wife of the hotel owner, Jacques, and mostly helps prepare meals for the inhabitants of the building. She also approves a hatred relationship between Bobbie's dog, Gruff. In some other versions of the show, she is referred to as "Claire".

Episodes

Plotlines 
The plotlines around Skiboy usually consist of dramatic events in his alpine home town, whether it is in the village, or on the slopes. Bandits seeking hidden treasures in the mountains interfere with Bobbie's curiosity, or mysterious things happen in the village or on the mountain faces. And rarely, might there be some romance that is cut unexpectedly by danger.

Series One Episode List

Production & Reception

Episode Production 
The episodes were filmed during the winter of 1973–74 at Saint-Luc in Switzerland, but were produced when the filming team got back to the United Kingdom. The first episode was broadcast on ITV on 13 May 1974, and the last one was aired on 5 August of that year. The filming team apparently had technical difficulties filming properly, and the people of Saint-Luc actually helped out the team.

Production Team 

This information comes from the end-credits of one of the available episodes on YouTube.

Audience Reception 
The show was rated poorly by the English audience, but was rated pretty successful in other countries. The exact Nielsen rating of the television show remains unknown to this date.

Foreign Versions 
Skiboy was translated into a variety of languages, including Spanish, French, Italian, Turkish, and Japanese. In those countries, the program was more successful than it was in the United Kingdom.

France 
In France, the show was called Á Skis Redoublés. The series aired in 1980 on FR3.

Spain 
In Spain, it was called El esquiador. The series aired originally in 1975 on Televisión Española.

Italy 
In Italy, it was called Ski Boy. The series aired originally in 1983 on an unknown channel.

Turkey 
In Turkey, the series was named Genç Kayakçi. The series' air date and channel of diffusion remains unknown to this date.

Japan 
In Japan, the film was broadcast under the name アルプスのスキーボーイ (literally, 'Ski Boy in the Alps' ) by NHK from 25 November to 18 December 1974 in a slot 少年ドラマシリーズ (literally, 'Drama series for adolescent').

External links 
 List of episodes on Skiboy
 Skiboy: Hot Ice (1) 
 Skiboy: Buried Menace (2) 
 Skiboy on IMDb
 Read an article in French on issuu.com (go to pages 6–7)
See also another wiki about the same subject on its french version on fr.wikipedia.org This version is maybe less perfect, but older.

References 

1974 British television series debuts
1974 British television series endings